Jeremy Ulick Browne, 11th Marquess of Sligo (4 June 1939 – 13 July 2014), styled Earl of Altamont until 1991, was an Irish hereditary peer and businessman. On the death of his father, he was entitled to sit in the House of Lords by virtue of the subsidiary title Baron Mounteagle, in the Peerage of the United Kingdom. However, he never took his seat and lost the right with the passage of the House of Lords Act 1999.

Biography
Altamont was the eldest son of Jose Gauche and Denis Browne, 10th Marquess of Sligo born in 1939. He was educated at Ludgrove School, St. Columba's College, Dublin, and briefly the Royal Agricultural College, which he left after only two terms. He returned to Ireland and help run the family estate, Westport House.

During The Troubles, the estate was invaded by IRA supporters who waved black flags in support of the 1981 Irish hunger strike, a situation which Altamont was able to defuse. In May 2014 his book, A Life at Westport House: 50 Years A-Going, was released.

He was married on 26 October 1961 to Jennifer June Lushington Cooper, daughter of Derek Cooper. Lady Sligo is the stepdaughter of the former Viscountess Ruthven of Canberra, and her father became in 1952 the stepfather of two young stepsons, now the late Earl of Gowrie and his brother the journalist and Islamic scholar Malise Ruthven. The Marquess and Marchioness had five daughters. After his death, his daughters inherited the family estate of Westport while his cousin Sebastian Browne succeeded him as Marquess.

Lord Sligo introduced a private members' Bill in Dáil Éireann in 1990 to allow the dissolution of a family trust which would prevent his five daughters from inheriting Westport House due to their female gender.

References

External links
The Browne Family, westporthouse.ie; accessed 3 November 2015.

1939 births
2014 deaths
People from County Mayo
Place of birth missing
Place of death missing
Jeremy
Jeremy
People educated at St Columba's College, Dublin
Earls of Clanricarde
People educated at Ludgrove School
Sligo